Ad Deir ("The Monastery"; Arabic: الدير ), also spelled ad-Dayr and el-Deir, is a monumental building carved out of rock in the ancient Jordanian city of Petra. The Deir was probably carved in the mid-first century AD.

Arguably one of the most iconic monuments in the Petra Archaeological Park, the Monastery is located high in the hills northwest of the Petra city center. It is the second most commonly visited monument in Petra, after the Khazneh or "Treasury".

The huge façade, the inner chamber and the other structures next to it or in the wider area around the Deir probably originally served a complex religious purpose, and was possibly repurposed as a church in the Byzantine period.

Location
The Monastery can be reached by ascending a nearly 800-step path (40-minute walking time) from the Basin. The Wadi Kharrubeh, the Lion's tomb, and small biclinia and grottos can be seen en route to the Monastery. From the Monastery, one can view the valleys of Wadi Araba and the gorges along with the semi-arid territory immediately around Petra.

Exterior design
Scholars believe that the flat area in front of the Monastery was levelled through human action in order to make the area suitable for social gatherings or religious occasions. Near the entrance of the structure are the remains of a wall and a colonnade.

This element has a conical roof that is topped by an urn.

Interior plan
The interior layout of the Monastery consists of a single square chamber with a broad niche in the back wall. Each end of this niche contains four steps, and the niche itself is framed by pillars and a segmental arch. The room is thought to have been painted and plastered, even though none of these decorations have survived into the modern day.

Architectural style
The monastery is a spectacular example of Nabataean architecture. Its blending of architectural styles is a hallmark of the dynamic and hybridised nature of Petra as a whole.

Architecturally, the Monastery follows classical Nabataean style, which is represented by a mixture of Hellenistic and Mesopotamian styles of construction. The Hellenistic influence can be seen in the columns of the Monastery, which are constructed in an abstracted Corinthian style. These columns are thought to have been included for aesthetic purposes, as the entire structure is carved directly into the sandstone cliff and does not require the support that columns would traditionally provide in freestanding Hellenistic structures. The façade as a whole boasts a Doric entablature (superstructure containing moldings and bands lying above the capitals), but does not have figures in the metope, only simple roundels.

Mesopotamian style is evident in the single, large entrance and the plain, window-like depressions of the facade. The door to the main chamber of the monastery is 8 metres high and provides the sole portal for the entry of light into the structure. The presence of square-topped tower structures on either side of the Monastery also demonstrate the Mesopotamian influence present in the structure.

Purpose

Nabataean
The role of the Deir, which has been probably built in the mid-first century CE, cannot be assessed with certainty, with hopes that further excavations could offer an answer. The suggestion that is served as a Nabataean royal tomb, based on external similarities with the Khazneh and the Tomb of the Roman Soldier is contradicted by the layout of the inner chamber and the apparently related structures in front of the Deir. The interior design doesn't contain any obvious burial, but that wouldn't be exceptional for the tombs of Petra. However, the rock-cut chamber has large central recess, a cella or adyton (innermost sanctuary), accessed by two short staircases, similar to those leading up to the cult podium of the Temple of the Winged Lions, which would be unusual for a tomb, as well as two low benches along the side walls, which suggest that the chamber was built to serve as a biclinium. Outside there are remains of a colonnade, a possible altar, and a round enclosure, possibly offering the frame for ritual performances which could be observed from a platform up on the plateau opposite the facade. The Deir can be interpreted as a private palatial complex with mixed residential, funerary and religious function, similar to the Tomb of the Roman Soldier complex. It could also have been, maybe together with the structures on the hill opposite the Deir, the site of large public religious events.

An inscription that was found on the wall of a nearby structure while it was being cleaned in 1991, mentioned "the mrzh'  of Obodat the god". Mrzh''' is interpreted as a private religious group with a limited number of members. The inscription is located too far from the Deir, but may possibly indicate that the entire Deir complex was dedicated to the Nabataean king, Obodas I, who was deified posthumously.

Byzantine period
The tomb has several incised crosses carved into the wall, which may indicate that the structure was reused as a church during the Byzantine period.

3D documentation with laser-scanning
The Monastery was spatially documented in 2013 by the non-profit research group Zamani Project, which specialises in 3D digital documentation of tangible cultural heritage. A 3D model can be viewed here. The data generated by the Zamani Project creates a permanent record that can be used for research, education, restoration, and conservation.

In popular culture
The Monastery has appeared in several Hollywood movies, such as the 2009 film Transformers: Revenge of the Fallen''.

See also
 Al-Khazneh
 Siq

References

External links

 Documentary about its construction at the Internet Movie Database
Photos of Ad-Deir at the Manar al-Athar photo archive
Nabataean architecture
Monuments and memorials in Jordan
Rock-cut tombs
Petra